Kossuth is an unincorporated community in Monroe Township, Washington County, in the U.S. state of Indiana.

History
A post office was established at Kossuth in 1850, and remained in operation until it was discontinued in 1901.

Geography

References

Unincorporated communities in Washington County, Indiana
Unincorporated communities in Indiana